Panamá Pacífico International Airport  is a commercial airport in Panama. It is located on the site of the former Howard Air Force Base, a United States Air Force base that was within the Panama Canal Zone. Panama City can be reached by crossing the nearby Bridge of the Americas.

Commercial airline service started in 2014, with Viva Air Colombia being the first to begin operations to Bogotá and Medellin. The airport receives regular Boeing 737 jet aircraft from Wingo.

Facilities
Most of the area around it is uninhabited and forms part of the Canal Zone watershed.

The runway has full instrument approach facilities. The runway length does not include  displaced thresholds on each end. There is high terrain just northwest of the runway.

History
Panama benefited from the closure of the air base. Some of the former military base is used to house call centers for technology companies like Dell Computer.

In February 2008, the production for the James Bond movie Quantum of Solace used the base to double for an airport in Bolivia.

The Panamanian National Air Show takes place at the airport every year, usually on the last Sunday of January.

Wingo started flights to Colombia in June 2017.  VivaColombia ceased flying there in May 2018, citing high taxes for operating at the airport.

Airlines and destinations

See also
Transport in Panama
List of airports in Panama

References

External links
 OpenStreetMap
 
 

Airports in Panama
2014 establishments in Panama